Mary Abigail "Abbie" Fillmore (March 27, 1832 – July 26, 1854) was the daughter of President Millard Fillmore and Abigail Powers. During her father's presidency from 1850 to 1853 she often served as White House hostess, in part due to her mother's illness.

Biography
A native of Buffalo, New York, she studied at a private school in Lenox, Massachusetts, and graduated from the Buffalo Normal School. She spoke French fluently and was conversant in Spanish, German, and Italian. She taught briefly in the Buffalo schools until her father became president in 1850.

An accomplished musician, she played the piano, harp, and guitar. While exercising the role of White House hostess she performed at White House functions.

Abigail Fillmore died 26 days after Fillmore's presidency ended, and Mary took over the management of her father's household. She accompanied him to a variety of public functions, notably including the widely promoted train and steamboat Grand Excursion of June 1854.

Her sudden death a few weeks later, from cholera at age 22, is thought to have contributed to her father's decision to come out of retirement and resume his political career.

References

External links
Picture History

1832 births
1854 deaths
People from Buffalo, New York
Children of presidents of the United States
Children of vice presidents of the United States
Acting first ladies of the United States
Mary
19th-century American people
19th-century American women
Deaths from cholera
Infectious disease deaths in New York (state)